RFA Eddyfirth (A261) was an Eddy class coastal tanker of the Royal Fleet Auxiliary.

Construction and design
Eddyfirth was launched at Lobnitz & Co.'s Renfrew shipyard on 10 September 1953 and completed on 10 February 1954. The ship displaced  light and  full load, with a capacity of 1650 tons of oil.

References

 Eddy-Class Coastal Tankers
 Historical RFA

Eddy-class coastal tankers
1953 ships
Ships built on the River Clyde